The 15th constituency of Bouches-du-Rhône is a French legislative constituency in Bouches-du-Rhône.

Deputies

Elections

2022

 
 
 
 
 
 
 
|-
| colspan="8" bgcolor="#E9E9E9"|
|-

2017

2012

|- style="background-color:#E9E9E9;text-align:center;"
! colspan="2" rowspan="2" style="text-align:left;" | Candidate
! rowspan="2" colspan="2" style="text-align:left;" | Party
! colspan="2" | 1st round
! colspan="2" | 2nd round
|- style="background-color:#E9E9E9;text-align:center;"
! width="75" | Votes
! width="30" | %
! width="75" | Votes
! width="30" | %
|-
| style="background-color:" |
| style="text-align:left;" | Bernard Reynès
| style="text-align:left;" | Union for a Popular Movement
| UMP
| 
| 35.46%
| 
| 41.60%
|-
| style="background-color:" |
| style="text-align:left;" | Nicette Aubert
| style="text-align:left;" | Miscellaneous Left
| DVG
| 
| 28.34%
| 
| 35.93%
|-
| style="background-color:" |
| style="text-align:left;" | Olivia Ponsdesserre
| style="text-align:left;" | Front National
| FN
| 
| 24.95%
| 
| 22.47%
|-
| style="background-color:" |
| style="text-align:left;" | Stella Apeddu
| style="text-align:left;" | Left Front
| FG
| 
| 5.28%
| colspan="2" style="text-align:left;" |
|-
| style="background-color:" |
| style="text-align:left;" | Stanislas Makowka
| style="text-align:left;" | Ecologist
| ECO
| 
| 1.77%
| colspan="2" style="text-align:left;" |
|-
| style="background-color:" |
| style="text-align:left;" | Didier Maurin
| style="text-align:left;" | 
| CEN
| 
| 1.63%
| colspan="2" style="text-align:left;" |
|-
| style="background-color:" |
| style="text-align:left;" | Marc-Antoine Seymard
| style="text-align:left;" | Far Right
| EXD
| 
| 0.75%
| colspan="2" style="text-align:left;" |
|-
| style="background-color:" |
| style="text-align:left;" | Jérôme Presti
| style="text-align:left;" | Other
| AUT
| 
| 0.56%
| colspan="2" style="text-align:left;" |
|-
| style="background-color:" |
| style="text-align:left;" | Sylvain Bourgin
| style="text-align:left;" | Miscellaneous Right
| DVD
| 
| 0.52%
| colspan="2" style="text-align:left;" |
|-
| style="background-color:" |
| style="text-align:left;" | Franck Moulet
| style="text-align:left;" | Far Left
| EXG
| 
| 0.40%
| colspan="2" style="text-align:left;" |
|-
| style="background-color:" |
| style="text-align:left;" | Michel Pozzetto
| style="text-align:left;" | Far Left
| EXG
| 
| 0.35%
| colspan="2" style="text-align:left;" |
|-
| colspan="8" style="background-color:#E9E9E9;"|
|- style="font-weight:bold"
| colspan="4" style="text-align:left;" | Total
| 
| 100%
| 
| 100%
|-
| colspan="8" style="background-color:#E9E9E9;"|
|-
| colspan="4" style="text-align:left;" | Registered voters
| 
| style="background-color:#E9E9E9;"|
| 
| style="background-color:#E9E9E9;"|
|-
| colspan="4" style="text-align:left;" | Blank/Void ballots
| 
| 1.30%
| 
| 1.33%
|-
| colspan="4" style="text-align:left;" | Turnout
| 
| 60.90%
| 
| 61.50%
|-
| colspan="4" style="text-align:left;" | Abstentions
| 
| 39.10%
| 
| 38.50%
|-
| colspan="8" style="background-color:#E9E9E9;"|
|- style="font-weight:bold"
| colspan="6" style="text-align:left;" | Result
| colspan="2" style="background-color:" | UMP GAIN FROM DVD
|}

2007

|- style="background-color:#E9E9E9;text-align:center;"
! colspan="2" rowspan="2" style="text-align:left;" | Candidate
! rowspan="2" colspan="2" style="text-align:left;" | Party
! colspan="2" | 1st round
! colspan="2" | 2nd round
|- style="background-color:#E9E9E9;text-align:center;"
! width="75" | Votes
! width="30" | %
! width="75" | Votes
! width="30" | %
|-
| style="background-color:" |
| style="text-align:left;" | Bernard Reynès
| style="text-align:left;" | Miscellaneous Right
| DVD
| 
| 27.17%
| 
| 61.65%
|-
| style="background-color:" |
| style="text-align:left;" | Léon Vachet
| style="text-align:left;" | Union for a Popular Movement
| UMP
| 
| 26.96%
| 
| 38.35%
|-
| style="background-color:" |
| style="text-align:left;" | Jacky Gerard
| style="text-align:left;" | Socialist Party
| PS
| 
| 17.89%
| colspan="2" style="text-align:left;" |
|-
| style="background-color:" |
| style="text-align:left;" | Caroline Reyre
| style="text-align:left;" | Front National
| FN
| 
| 6.56%
| colspan="2" style="text-align:left;" |
|-
| style="background-color:" |
| style="text-align:left;" | Françoise Jupiter
| style="text-align:left;" | Democratic Movement
| MoDem
| 
| 5.60%
| colspan="2" style="text-align:left;" |
|-
| style="background-color:" |
| style="text-align:left;" | Jacques Rousset
| style="text-align:left;" | Communist
| PCF
| 
| 4.79%
| colspan="2" style="text-align:left;" |
|-
| style="background-color:" |
| style="text-align:left;" | Audrey Machart
| style="text-align:left;" | Far Left
| EXG
| 
| 2.65%
| colspan="2" style="text-align:left;" |
|-
| style="background-color:" |
| style="text-align:left;" | David Gourbeault
| style="text-align:left;" | The Greens
| VEC
| 
| 2.26%
| colspan="2" style="text-align:left;" |
|-
| style="background-color:" |
| style="text-align:left;" | Francis Maurin
| style="text-align:left;" | Hunting, Fishing, Nature, Traditions
| CPNT
| 
| 1.87%
| colspan="2" style="text-align:left;" |
|-
| style="background-color:" |
| style="text-align:left;" | Pierre Vidal
| style="text-align:left;" | Ecologist
| ECO
| 
| 1.49%
| colspan="2" style="text-align:left;" |
|-
| style="background-color:" |
| style="text-align:left;" | Michel Pozzetto
| style="text-align:left;" | Far Left
| EXG
| 
| 0.74%
| colspan="2" style="text-align:left;" |
|-
| style="background-color:" |
| style="text-align:left;" | Marc-Antoine Seymard
| style="text-align:left;" | Far Right
| EXD
| 
| 0.72%
| colspan="2" style="text-align:left;" |
|-
| style="background-color:" |
| style="text-align:left;" | Jocelyne Gayvallet
| style="text-align:left;" | Independent
| DIV
| 
| 0.67%
| colspan="2" style="text-align:left;" |
|-
| style="background-color:" |
| style="text-align:left;" | Mireille Barthelemy
| style="text-align:left;" | Movement for France
| MPF
| 
| 0.63%
| colspan="2" style="text-align:left;" |
|-
| style="background-color:" |
| style="text-align:left;" | Elvire Debutte
| style="text-align:left;" | Far Left
| EXG
| 
| 0.00%
| colspan="2" style="text-align:left;" |
|-
| colspan="8" style="background-color:#E9E9E9;"|
|- style="font-weight:bold"
| colspan="4" style="text-align:left;" | Total
| 
| 100%
| 
| 100%
|-
| colspan="8" style="background-color:#E9E9E9;"|
|-
| colspan="4" style="text-align:left;" | Registered voters
| 
| style="background-color:#E9E9E9;"|
| 
| style="background-color:#E9E9E9;"|
|-
| colspan="4" style="text-align:left;" | Blank/Void ballots
| 
| 1.98%
| 
| 16.81%
|-
| colspan="4" style="text-align:left;" | Turnout
| 
| 62.49%
| 
| 52.20%
|-
| colspan="4" style="text-align:left;" | Abstentions
| 
| 37.51%
| 
| 47.80%
|-
| colspan="8" style="background-color:#E9E9E9;"|
|- style="font-weight:bold"
| colspan="6" style="text-align:left;" | Result
| colspan="2" style="background-color:" | DVD GAIN
|}

2002

 
 
 
 
 
 
 
 
|-
| colspan="8" bgcolor="#E9E9E9"|
|-

1997

 
 
 
 
 
 
 
|-
| colspan="8" bgcolor="#E9E9E9"|
|-

References

15